The most formal manner of expressing the full date and/or time in South Korea is to suffix each of the year, month, day, ante/post-meridiem indicator, hour, minute and second (in this order, i.e. with larger units first) with the corresponding unit and separating each with a space:

  nyeon for year;
  wol for month;
  il for day;
  ojeon for a.m.;  ohu for p.m.;
  si for hour;
  bun for minute; and
  cho for second.
For example, the ISO 8601 timestamp 1975-07-14 09:18:32 would be written as “”.

The same rules apply when expressing the date or the time alone, e.g., “”, “”, “”, “” and “”.

The national standard (KSXISO8601, formerly KSX1511) also recognizes the ISO-8601-compliant date/time format of YYYY-MM-DD HH:MM:SS, which is widely used in computing and on the Korean internet.

Date
In written documents, the date form above (but not the time) is often abbreviated by replacing each unit suffix with a single period; for example,  would be abbreviated as “” (note the trailing period and intervening spaces).

Time

Both the 12-hour and 24-hour notations are widely used in South Korea.

12-hour clock is predominantly used in informal daily life, and the ante/post-meridiem indicator is often omitted where doing so does not introduce ambiguity.

Half past the hour is commonly—especially in spoken Korean—abbreviated as  ban, which literally means “half”; for example, 13:30 is either expressed as “” or “”.

When the time is expressed in the HH:MM:SS notation, the Roman ante/post-meridiem indicators (AM and PM) are also used frequently. In addition, they sometimes follow the convention of writing the Korean-style indicator before the time; it is not uncommon to encounter times expressed in such a way, e.g., “” instead of “”.

Two words,  jeong-o and  jajeong, are sometimes used to indicate 12:00 and 0:00 respectively—much in the same way the English words noon and midnight are used.

The 24-hour notation is more commonly used in text and is written "" or "". Examples include railway timetables, plane departure and landing timings, and TV schedules. In movie theaters it is also not uncommon to see something like 25:30 for the 01:30 AM movie.

References 

Time in South Korea
South Korea